Umurlu may refer to the following places in Turkey:

 Umurlu, Aydın
 Umurlu, Otlukbeli
 Umurlu, Sason